Halina Zalewska (1940 - 19 August 1976) was a Polish-born Italian actress.

Life and career 
Born in Poland, Zalewska was the daughter of a Polish noblewoman and an Italian businnessman. She spent her childhood in Alassio, her father's birthplace. Her career was launched by winning the beauty pageant Miss Muretto in 1958. She was very active in genre films,but her career include also a few art films, including a minor role in Luchino Visconti's The Leopard.

Zalewska accidentally died in a fire in 1976, aged 36 years old. She was the half-sister of actress Ely Galleani.

Selected filmography 
 Leoni al sole (1961) - Paola
 The Leopard (1963)
 Hercules, Samson and Ulysses (1963)
 The Warm Life (1964)
 Triumph of the Ten Gladiators (1964) - Myrta
 The Long Hair of Death (1964) - Lisabeth Karnstein
 Amore mio (1964)
 Hard Time for Princes (1965) - Luisetta
 Questo pazzo, pazzo mondo della canzone (1965)
 Giant of the Evil Island (1965) - Dona Alma Morales
 Seven Dollars on the Red (1966) - Mexican Woman (uncredited)
 An Angel for Satan (1966) - Luisa
 Agente segreto 777 - Invito ad uccidere (1966) - Frida
 War Between the Planets (1966) - Janet Norton
 The Ugly Ones (1966) - Eden
 La morte viene dal pianeta Aytin (1967) - Lt. Teri Sanchez
 Joe l'implacabile (1967) - Betty
 Omicidio per appuntamento (1967) - Fidelia Forrester
 Gente d'onore (1967)
 Hate Is My God (1969) - Rosalie Field
 Nero Wolfe: Salsicce 'Mezzanotte' (1971, TV Series) - Dina Laszlo
 La polizia brancola nel buio (1975) - (final film role)

References

External links 
 

1940 births
1976 deaths
Italian film actresses
Italian television actresses
20th-century Italian actresses
Swiss emigrants to Italy